John Ramsay Swinney (born 13 April 1964) is a Scottish politician who has served as Deputy First Minister of Scotland since 2014 and Cabinet Secretary for Covid Recovery since 2021. He was the Leader of the Scottish National Party (SNP) from 2000 to 2004. He served as Education Secretary from 2016 to 2021 and as Finance Secretary from 2007 to 2016. Swinney has also served as the Member of the Scottish Parliament (MSP) for Perthshire North since 2011, having previously represented North Tayside from 1999 to 2011.

Born in Edinburgh, Swinney graduated with a MA in politics at the University of Edinburgh. He joined the SNP at a young age and quickly rose to prominence serving as the National Secretary from 1986 to 1992 and Depute Leader of the SNP from 1998 to 2000. Swinney served in the British House of Commons as Member of Parliament for Tayside North from 1997 to 2001. He was elected to the inaugural Scottish Parliament in 1999. After Alex Salmond resigned the party leadership in 2000, Swinney was elected Leader of the Scottish National Party in the ensuing leadership contest. He became Leader of the Opposition in the Scottish Parliament. Swinney's leadership proved ineffectual, with a loss of one MP in 2001 and a further reduction to 27 MSPs in 2003 despite the Officegate scandal unseating previous First Minister Henry McLeish. However, the only parties to gain seats in that election were the Scottish Greens and the Scottish Socialist Party (SSP) which, like the SNP, support independence. After an unsuccessful leadership challenge in 2003, Swinney stepped down following disappointing results in the 2004 European Parliament election with Salmond returning to the role in the subsequent 2004 leadership contest.

From 2004 to 2007, Swinney sat in the SNP's opposition backbench. In the 2007 Scottish election, the SNP won the highest number of seats in the Scottish Parliament and Salmond was subsequently appointed First Minister of Scotland. Swinney served under Salmond as Cabinet Secretary for Finance, Employment and Sustainable Growth from 2007 to 2014. After Nicola Sturgeon succeeded Salmond, she appointed Swinney as Deputy First Minister of Scotland in 2014. He also served as Cabinet Secretary for Finance, Constitution and Economy, until that role was divided into two posts in the second Sturgeon government as a result of the expansion of the Scottish Parliament's financial powers; he was then appointed Cabinet Secretary for Education and Skills in 2016, and then as Cabinet Secretary for Covid Recovery in 2021. On 25 May 2022, Swinney became the longest serving Deputy First Minister, surpassing the previous record which was held by Sturgeon. On 2 March 2023, Swinney announced his resignation as Deputy First Minister in response to Nicola Sturgeon's resignation as First Minister.

Early life

Family, education and early career 
John Ramsay Swinney was born on 13 April 1964 in the Western General Hospital, Edinburgh, the son of Kenneth Swinney, a garage manager, and Agnes Weir Swinney (née Hunter). His uncle Tom Hunter was awarded the Victoria Cross whilst serving with the Royal Marines during the Second World War. His maternal grandparents, Ramsey and Mary Hunter, were from England, having moved to Edinburgh in the 1920s.

He was educated at Forrester High School, before attending the University of Edinburgh, where he graduated with an Master of Arts Honours degree in politics in 1986. Swinney was a research officer for the Scottish Coal Project from 1987 to 1988, a senior management consultant with Development Options from 1988 to 1992, and a strategic planning principal with Scottish Amicable Building Society from 1992 to 1997.

Early political involvement 
Swinney joined the Scottish National Party (SNP) in 1979 at the age of 15, citing his anger at the way in which Scotland had been portrayed by television commentators at the Commonwealth Games. He quickly became a prominent figure in the party's youth wing, the Young Scottish Nationalist, now known as the Young Scots for Independence (YSI). He served as the SNP's Assistant National Secretary, before becoming the National Secretary in 1986, at the age of 22.

He served as the national secretary until 1992, then vice convenor, later senior vice-convenor (deputy leader) from 1992 to 1997. At the time of the 1990 leadership contest he supported Margaret Ewing in her bid to become SNP leader, but this did not stop him becoming politically close to the man who went on to win that contest, Alex Salmond.

Early political career

House of Commons 
At the 1997 general election, he was elected as Member of Parliament (MP) for the Tayside North constituency, and in 1999 he was elected to represent the same area at the Scottish Parliament.

He stood down as a Westminster MP at the 2001 general election in order to avoid splitting his time, in line with all of his colleagues who found themselves in a similar 'dual mandate' position.

Election to Holyrood 
In 1999, Swinney was elected to the 1st Scottish Parliament, representing the North Tayside constituency. In Salmond's opposition cabinet, he served as the Spokesman on Enterprise and Lifelong Learning. He also served on the Parliament's Finance Committee and was the Convener of the Enterprise and Lifelong Learning Committee.

Leadership of the Scottish National Party (2000–2004)

Leadership bid 

In 2000, Alex Salmond resigned as leader of the SNP, which triggered a leadership contest. Swinney ran in the election against Alex Neil. The leadership contest was dominated by internal fights in the party between Gradualists, who advocated Scottish devolution as step towards independence, and Fundamentalists, who were  suspicious of devolution and supported a more radical approach. Swinney represented the gradualist wing and Neil represented the fundamentalists wing. Whilst both candidates supported the position of the SNP on the centre-left, Neil was seen as the more left-wing of the two, and individuals associated with the Neil campaign argued that a Swinney leadership would drag the SNP to the right.

Swinney won an overwhelming majority of votes by party delegates securing 67.1% of votes. He was appointed leader at the party's conference on 16 September 2000. Roseanna Cunningham, who endorsed Swinney in the leadership race, was elected Depute Leader.

Tenure

Internal party divisions 
Swinney's leadership quickly came under challenge. His subdued style of debating technique was often contrasted with that of his more charismatic predecessor. In 2002, Dorothy-Grace Elder, the SNP MSP for the Glasgow region, resigned her party membership after coming dissatisfied with the leadership of the SNP. She sat as an independent MSP, but Swinney called for her resignation calling her actions to be a "flout [of] the democratic will of the people of Glasgow". Margo MacDonald, a fundamentalists within the SNP, voiced of her lack of confidence in Swinney's leadership. MacDonald was placed fifth in the Lothians region for the 2003 Parliament election in the SNP's candidate selection, effectively ending her chances of being re-elected as an SNP MSP. In protest, she ran instead as an independent candidate and was later expelled from the party.

In 2003, a former parliamentary candidate and a party activist in the Shetland Islands Brian Nugent announced that he was forming his own pro-independence party, the Scottish Party, which eventually relaunched itself as the Free Scotland Party, in response to what he perceived to be an overly pro-EU stance by the SNP.

2001 UK and 2003 Scottish elections 

Swinney led the SNP through a poor election result at the 2001 UK General election. The party failed to take any of their target seats and saw the loss of one of their MPs, reducing their representation at Westminster from six to five. In the Perth constituency, the Scottish Conservatives were 50 votes behind the SNP. Although, the SNP's vote share remained the second-largest party, behind Labour, their vote share fell by 2%. Swinney's predecessor, Salmond, stated "consolidating as the second party in Scotland is no mean achievement" and highlighted it put the SNP in a good position for the upcoming Scottish Parliament election in 2003. Following the results of the election, Swinney admitted there were "lessons to learn" and ensured the SNP would be the "principal opposition party in Scottish politics".

In the 2003 election, the SNP performed poorly in yet another election, with the party's vote share dropping by 4.9%. They lost eight of their seats they had gained in the previous election under the leadership of Salmond. Despite a poor result, this was also mirrored by the Scottish Labour Party, who lost six MSPs and their vote share dropped by 4.2%. The SNP remained the second-largest party at Holyrood. The decline in support for the SNP was viewed by some as a rejection of the case for Scottish independence, however, the only parties which increased their representation in that election were the Scottish Socialist Party (SSP) and the Scottish Green Party, both of which also support independence.

2003 leadership challenge 

Following the results of the 2003 Scottish Parliament election, Bill Wilson, a party activist, became convinced that a change of direction was needed by the SNP leadership. After discussing this with various SNP members, he was persuaded to contest the leadership himself and launched a challenge against the Swinney. Wilson ran a campaign attacking Swinney's proposals for party reform, which he claimed would centralise power and impoverish local branches. Wilson also challenged Swinney to a series of debates, although Swinney refused to take part.

The election was yet another fight between the party's fundamentalists and gradualists, with Wilson attacking Swinney's proposal for a referendum on independence before pursuing negotiations with the British government. Wilson argued that as soon as the SNP can form a government it should pursue negotiations to end the union. Cunningham called Wilson was a "stalking horse" candidate put forward to "weaken and damage" the leadership.

The election was held at the party's 69th annual conference, and saw Swinney winning a massive victory over Wilson. Moves in support of Wilson's proposition of pursuing independence negotiations without a referendum were thrown out at the party conference, and Swinney won significant policy battles over imposing a monthly levy on party MP's, MSP's, and MEP's. In a surprise result, the new central membership system was also approved. The membership changes had been a key issue of attack from Wilson. Soon afterwards, the party's National Executive Committee decided to suspend and then expel Campbell Martin. He had backed Wilson's leadership challenge and had continued to be overtly critical of Swinney's leadership, resulting in disciplinary action. This was the last SNP election to use the delegate voting method. Future elections would be based on a one-person-one-vote postal vote system.

Scottish independence 
In September 2003 he urged SNP activists to ask the public, "Do you want independence, yes or no? And then tell the Brits to get off." A spokesman for Scottish Labour condemned the Swinney's use of language and said, "There is no place in Scotland for his brand of extreme nationalism."

2004 European Parliament elections 
Though retaining its two seats at the 2004 European elections, in a smaller field of 7 (Scotland up until then had 8 MEPs) the Scottish press and certain elements within the fundamentalist wing of the Party depicted the result as a disaster for the SNP putting further pressure on Swinney to resign.

Resignation 
After the results of the 2004 European Parliament election, senior figures within the SNP began privately briefing against Swinney. Gil Paterson, a former MSP for Central Scotland, was the first to call for Swinney's departure, with Michael Russell, a former potential campaign manager for Swinney calling for a change in approach from the SNP. Members of the SNP shadow cabinet began privately discussing removing Swinney from the leadership, and Alex Salmond advised Swinney to resign in exchange for senior party figures not calling openly for his resignation. On 22 June 2004, Swinney resigned as leader of the Scottish National Party, triggering a leadership contest. He was succeed by Alex Salmond after winning more than 75% of votes against Roseanna Cunningham and Michael Russell on a joint leadership ticket with Nicola Sturgeon.

SNP in opposition (2004–2007) 
From 2004 until the 2007 Scottish Parliament election, Swinney sat on the SNP's opposition backbenches. He served as a convener on the Parliament's European and External Relations Committee from 2004 to 2005 and deputy convener on the Finance Committee from 2005 to 2007.  Swinney was a substitute member of the Audit Committee from 2004 to 2007. In September 2005, Swinney was made Shadow Minister for Finance.

Salmond administration (2007–2014)

Finance Secretary: 2007–2016 

In the 2007 election to the 3rd Scottish Parliament, the SNP emerged as the largest party, with one seat more than the governing Scottish Labour. Initially the SNP proposed coalition talks with the Scottish Liberal Democrats, however, they declined and instead Swinney led coalition talks with the Scottish Greens. After an agreement, Salmond was appointed first minister of Scotland and he appointed Swinney as the Cabinet Secretary for Finance and Sustainable Growth in his first minority government.

As response to Swinney not notifying the Scottish Parliament that he had let the Scottish Variable Rate lapse due to not funding this tax mechanism, the Scottish Parliament voted to censure him and called his actions "an abuse of power". Subsequently, a freedom of information request showed that even if Swinney had funded the mechanism, problems and delays in the HM Revenue & Customs computer system made any collection of the tax impossible. The Scottish Government added, "The power has not lapsed, the HMRC simply does not have an IT system capable of delivering a ten-month state of readiness."

2008 financial crisis 

As Finance Secretary, Swinney was faced with the 2008 financial crash, which resulted in the Scottish economy entering recession.

Deputy First Minister of Scotland (2014–present) 

Following the defeat of the Yes Scotland campaign in the 2014 referendum, Salmond resigned as leader of the SNP and Swinney was seen as a likely candidate in the leadership race, however, he "unreservedly" ruled himself out for a second bid as leader and endorsed Nicola Sturgeon. Sturgeon was elected unopposed as leader and was subsequently appointed First Minister of Scotland. On 21 November 2014, Sturgeon appointed Swinney as Deputy First Minister. He remained as Finance Secretary in Sturgeon's new cabinet.

Education Secretary: 2016–2021 
In the 2016 Scottish Parliament election, the SNP lost its overall majority, but remained the largest party with Sturgeon securing a second term as first minister. She reappointed Swinney as deputy first minister, and for the first time in nine years, he was reshuffled from his roles as Finance Secretary to Cabinet Secretary for Education and Skills.

Educational performance 
After the 2017 General Election saw the SNP lose 21 seats, pollster Professor John Curtice told the BBC that the party's record on education had likely dented its popularity: "The SNP may want to reflect that their domestic record, not least on schools, is beginning to undermine their support among those who on the constitutional question are still willing to support the Nationalist position."

In March 2020, after the results of Scottish students dropped in maths and science in the international PISA rankings for education, Swinney admitted, "There is progress to be made in maths and science." Scottish Conservative education spokeswoman Liz Smith said: "These two areas are so critical to the success of much of Scotland's modern economy. We should be doing so much better."

2020 SQA exam controversy 
In August 2020 he was subject to a vote of no confidence in Parliament, with the Conservatives, Labour and the Liberal Democrats all accusing Swinney of creating an exam results system which "unfairly penalised pupils at schools which had historically not performed so well". During the No Confidence debate, Nicola Sturgeon described him as "one of the most decent and dedicated people in Scottish politics", while The Herald newspaper reported that: "Mr Swinney endured a deeply uncomfortable hour in the Holyrood chamber, as opposition MSPs said he had been a serial failure at the education portfolio, and he knew it." The motion was defeated by 67 votes to 58 resulting in Swinney surviving the vote and remaining as Scottish Education Secretary.

Vote of no confidence 
In March 2021 Swinney was the subject of a second motion of no confidence. As the minister in charge of liaising with the Committee on the Scottish Government Handling of Harassment Complaints, Swinney twice refused to publish legal advice requested by the committee. After two votes in Parliament failed to persuade him to publish the advice, opposition parties announced a motion of no confidence in him. Swinney u-turned and published the advice; the Scottish Greens declared they would not support the motion of no confidence and it was defeated by 65 votes to 57.

Attainment gap 
A report by Audit Scotland in March 2021 concluded that the results of Swinney's efforts to reduce the poverty related attainment gap in Scottish education were "limited and [fell] short of the Scottish Government’s aims. Improvement needs to happen more quickly and there needs to be greater consistency across the country." In 10 Scottish council areas the attainment gap between the richest and the poorest children increased.

Covid Recovery Secretary: 2021–present 

Following the 2021 Scottish Parliament election, Scottish Labour urged Sturgeon to replace Swinney as Cabinet Secretary for Education, citing what it called "a litany of failures", in the "hope a new minister can stop the rot." On 18 May, Sturgeon announced John Swinney would continue as Deputy First Minister but would be reshuffled to the new cabinet role as Cabinet Secretary for Covid Recovery.

Following the resignation of Nicola Sturgeon, Swinney announced that he was standing down from his position as Deputy First Minister on 2 March 2023. He stated that it had been an "honour to serve Scotland".

Political positions

Monarchy 
In September 2022, he stated that the monarch should remain head of state of an independent Scotland.

Personal life
Swinney was married to Lorna King from 1991 to 1998. They had two children: Judith and Stuart. The couple divorced in 1998 after the Daily Record revealed King had an affair with a married nursery teacher. In 2003, he married Elizabeth Quigley, a BBC Scotland News reporter. In 2010, she gave birth to Swinney's third child, Matthew. They live in Blairgowrie in Perth and Kinross.

References

Notes

External links

 John Swinney MSP
 
 

1964 births
Living people
Members of the Parliament of the United Kingdom for Scottish constituencies
Leaders of the Scottish National Party
Scottish National Party MPs
Scottish National Party MSPs
Alumni of the University of Edinburgh
Members of the Scottish Cabinet
Finance ministers of Scotland
UK MPs 1997–2001
Members of the Scottish Parliament 1999–2003
Members of the Scottish Parliament 2003–2007
Members of the Scottish Parliament 2007–2011
Members of the Scottish Parliament 2011–2016
Members of the Scottish Parliament 2016–2021
Members of the Scottish Parliament 2021–2026
People educated at Forrester High School
Politicians from Edinburgh
Deputy First Ministers of Scotland